Carinda Paz is a small town in the northeast  region of the Mexican state of Michoacán. It is a small town of 374 inhabitants.  The main community is Senguio. 
It was founded by Mazahuas tribes in the frontiers of the Aztec Empire and the Tarasca state. It was conquered by Spain in 1522.

It is the home of the famous merengue dancer Patricia Ramírez Ríos.

Populated places in Michoacán